The Swedish Federation for Lesbian, Gay, Bisexual, Transgender and Queer Rights (formerly ) is a Swedish organization working for LGBT rights. Lawyer and social worker Trifa Shakely was elected as the new president in 2021.

It was founded in 1950, which makes it one of the oldest LGBT rights organizations in the world. As of 2018, it had about 7,000 members and has 36 regional offices spread over the country.

RFSL was a major lobbyist for gender-neutral marriage, a goal that was reached in April 2009 after 50 years of working with that specific issue.

In July 2007, RFSL received consultative status with the United Nations Economic and Social Council.

See also

LGBT rights in Sweden
List of LGBT rights organizations
Ombudsman against Discrimination on Grounds of Sexual Orientation

References

External links
 

LGBT political advocacy groups in Sweden
Organizations established in 1950
1950s in LGBT history